Canbya aurea, common name yellow pygmy-poppy, is a plant species endemic to the relatively cool northern deserts of the western United States. It is known only from central and southeastern Oregon and northwestern Nevada, as well as one collection reported from Mono County, California.

Flowers are bright yellow, up to 10 mm across.

References

Papaveroideae
Flora of the Great Basin
Flora of California
Flora of Nevada
Flora of Oregon
Endemic flora of the United States
Taxa named by Sereno Watson
Flora without expected TNC conservation status